A state forest or national forest is a forest that is administered or protected by a sovereign or federated state, or territory.

Background
State forests are forests that are administered or protected by some agency of a sovereign or federated state, or territory. The precise application of the terms vary by jurisdiction. For example:
 In Australia, a state forest is a forest that is protected by state laws, rather than by the Government of Australia.
 In Austria, the state forests are managed by the 
 In Brazil, a national forest is a protected area for sustainablility
 In Canada, provinces administer provincial forests
 In France, a national forest is a forest owned by the French state
 In Germany, state forests are either federal forest called the Bundesforst, which is controlled by the Institute for Federal Real Estate (Bundesforstverwaltung), or forest of the Länder called Landesforste
 In Iceland, forests managed by the Icelandic Forest Service are classified as national forests.
 In New Zealand, a state forest is a forest that is controlled by the Ministry for Primary Industries.
 In Poland, state-owned forests are managed by the State Forests agency
 In the United Kingdom, a state forest is any forest (usually plantations) owned and managed by the Forestry Commission. England also has The National Forest project
 In the United States, a state forest is a forest owned by one of the individual states while a national forest is owned by the federal government

Purposes
The purpose of a state forest varies between countries and the quality of the landscape it covers. In many places, state forests are divided into land for logging plantations, area for conservation, area for livestock grazing, and area for visitor recreation. As an example, in the state of California, the Redwood National and State Parks are a string of protected forests, beaches, and grasslands along Northern California's coast; these are owned by both the U.S. federal government and the State of California.

See also 
 List of types of formally designated forests
 Provincial forest

References

Types of formally designated forests